The Bexhill West branch line was a short double-track branch line which was opened on 1 June 1902. It was built by the Crowhurst, Sidley & Bexhill Railway under the patronage of the South Eastern Railway. The Chief Engineer to the project was Lt Col Arthur John Barry. The line was closed under the Beeching Axe on 15 June 1964.

History

Background
In the late nineteenth century, Bexhill had expanded rapidly. In 1896, a line was promoted by the Crowhurst, Sidley and Bexhill Railway, which was nominally independent. The scheme was supported by the South Eastern Railway, which entered into an operating arrangement with the London, Chatham and Dover Railway which came into effect on 1 January 1899, forming the South Eastern and Chatham Railway. The Crowhurst, Sidley & Bexhill Railway Company was incorporated in 1897, and permission was granted in that year for the line's construction. Lt Col Arthur John Barry was appointed as Chief Engineer to the project.

Between Crowhurst and Sidley, a major viaduct was built to carry the line across a valley. Seven contractors' locomotives were used in the construction of the line, one of which was an 0-6-0ST named St Leonards. Over  of earth was moved during the construction of the line.

Description
The line was double track throughout.

The largest structure on the line was the Combe Haven Viaduct, which was also known as the Filsham, Sidley or Crowhurst Viaduct. The viaduct took two years to build, due to the nature of the ground it was built on. Built at a cost of £244,000, over 9,000,000 bricks were used in the construction of the viaduct. Following the closure of the line, it was proposed in late 1968 to demolish the viaduct. Local residents were opposed to the plan, and a question was asked in Parliament by Neill Cooper-Key regarding the preservation of the viaduct, which was not listed. Kenneth Robinson answered that British Railways were prepared to transfer ownership of the viaduct to any group willing to take it, but that maintenance costs were considerable.  

There were three stations built for the line:

  was built to serve the branch. The station was provided with two through tracks and two tracks to serve the platforms. Each platform had a bay serving the branch.

  station was opened with the branch on 1 June 1902. It was closed during the First World War on 1 January 1917 before reopening on 14 June 1920. The entrance at Sidley Station for services to Bexhill West was down some steps, while the Crowhurst and London platform had direct access from the road. The station also had a small goods yard and coal merchants. The original entrance building was demolished in 1971.  A petrol station now stands on the site. 

  was the terminus of the line. It had two island platform, two signal boxes, an extensive goods yard, and an engine shed. Only platforms 1 and 2 would be used; platform 3 was abandoned and platform never had tracks. The station was temporarily closed on 1 January 1917 before reopening on 1 March 1919. It opened as Bexhill in 1902,  then renamed Bexhill-on-Sea in 1920; Bexhill (Eastern) on 9 July 1923; before finally becoming Bexhill West in November 1929.

Operation
The line was operated from the outset by the South Eastern and Chatham Railway. The South Eastern Railway absorbed the Crowhurst, Sidley and Bexhill Railway Company in 1905. Under the SE&CR, services were worked by the older classes of SER locomotives, which were stationed at Bexhill. These continued until 1936, when push-pull trains were introduced. Under British Railways, push-pull services were operated by H Class 0-4-4T locomotives. Between 27 November 1949 and 5 June 1950, Bo Peep tunnel was closed to traffic and all services on the Hastings line were diverted to Bexhill West. A push-pull service operated between Crowhurst Junction and  during the closure of the tunnel.

When steam was eliminated from the Hastings Line, Diesel-Electric Multiple Units took over the services. This took place in June 1958; a new timetable was introduced at the same time, providing the line with an hourly service. It was continued during the early years of the Hastings Diesel units; these were six-car trains, but the service was not shown in public timetables.

A daily freight train ran from Tonbridge to Bexhill West. In 1958 it was usually hauled by a Q class engine.

Closure
It is claimed that the timetables were altered to the detriment of those commuters who wished to use the line. Fares were also raised, adding a further disincentive. The line was closed as part of the Beeching Axe. The last day of public services was 14 June 1964. Some of the services on that day were operated by 6S DEMU № 1007, and 2H DEMU № 1120. The 6S was running reduced to four carriages at the time. The Coombe Valley viaduct was demolished in two stages, on 23 May and 12 June 1969.

References

Sources

Further reading
 

Closed railway lines in South East England
Rail transport in East Sussex
Railway lines opened in 1902
Railway lines closed in 1964
Standard gauge railways in England